Jacques Kielbaye (born 28 July 1920, date of death unknown) was a Belgian field hockey player. He competed in the men's tournament at the 1948 Summer Olympics.

References

External links
 

1920 births
Year of death missing
Belgian male field hockey players
Olympic field hockey players of Belgium
Field hockey players at the 1948 Summer Olympics
People from Anderlecht
Field hockey players from Brussels
20th-century Belgian people